AUQ or auq may refer to:

 AUQ, the IATA code for Atuona Airport, Hiva Oa, Marquesas Islands, French Polynesia
 auq, the ISO 639-3 code for Anus language, Papua, Indonesia